Arthur Frederick Bues was a Major League Baseball third baseman. He was born on March 3, 1888, in Milwaukee, Wisconsin. Art was the nephew of George Stallings. Bues made his Major League debut on April 17, 1913, for the Boston Braves. He had just 1 at bat in 2 games. In 1914 he played for the Chicago Cubs in 14 games. He had 45 at-bats with 10 hits. He recorded no home runs and 4 RBIs.

Art Bues died on November 7, 1954, in Whitefish Bay, Wisconsin.

External links

1888 births
1954 deaths
Major League Baseball third basemen
Baseball players from Milwaukee
Boston Braves players
Chicago Cubs players
Lethbridge Miners players
La Crosse Pinks players
Racine Belles (1909–1915) players
Minneapolis Millers (baseball) players
Seattle Giants players
Buffalo Bisons (minor league) players
Jersey City Skeeters players
Columbus Senators players
Kansas City Blues (baseball) players
Baltimore Orioles (IL) players
Louisville Colonels (minor league) players
Mobile Bears players
Milwaukee Brewers (minor league) players